DR3 may refer to:

 Death receptor 3, a protein
 DR-3, a highway in the Dominican Republic
 DR3 register, a debug register of x86 processors
 DR3 (car), an Italian automobile by DR Motor Company
 DR3, a Danish television channel from DR
 Dead Rising 3, a video game for the Xbox One console
 Danganronpa 3: The End of Hope's Peak High School, an anime series in the Danganronpa franchise
 Daniel Ricciardo, Formula One driver using racing number 3
 DR3 (DR for "Dreieckrechner"), a German flight computer manufactured as of 1943
 DR3: Gaia Data Release 3